Eleanor Plantagenet  may refer to:

Eleanor of Lancaster (1318–1372), wife of John de Beaumont and Richard Fitz Alan
Eleanor, Fair Maid of Brittany (c. 1141–1241), daughter of Duke Geoffrey II of Brittany
Eleanor of Leicester (1215–1275), daughter of King John of England and wife of William Marshall and Simon de Montfort

See also
Eleanor of England (disambiguation)